Balmain East ferry wharf (also known as Darling Street ferry wharf) is located on Sydney Harbour serving the Sydney suburb of Balmain East.

History
The Balmain East ferry wharf has been operating since the 1840s as Balmain's main wharf. Originally, watermen offered the first services on demand in small rowing skiffs or sailing dinghies. In February 1844 the steamer Waterman commenced the first public ferry service between Balmain and the Australian Gas Light Company wharf at Millers Point. The service was established by Henry Perdriau, the owner of Perdriau Ferries, later Balmain Steam Ferries.

From the beginning of the 20th century, Sydney's electric tram system down Darling Street to the wharf and connected with the ferries. The tramway operated until 1954. As the road next to the wharf had a grade of 1 in 8, a unique counterweight dummy system was installed under the road surface to help push trams up the hill. An underground counterweight system was connected by cable to a cable tram grip dummy on the track on the surface. A tram descending would push the grip dummy ahead of it (which raised the counterweight). On the return journey, the grip dummy would give the tram a helpful push. The mechanism was preserved at the Sydney Tramway Museum when the tramway was removed.

On 14 January 2015, the wharf closed for a rebuild with the existing structure demolished and a new one opened on 18 June 2015.

Services
Services are operated by First Fleet class ferries. Balmain East wharf is also served by weekday and Saturday evening Parramatta River services from Sydney Olympic Park.

Interchanges
Transit Systems operate one route to and from Balmain East wharf:
442: to Queen Victoria Building

References

External links

Balmain East Wharf at Transport for New South Wales (Archived 11 June 2019)
Balmain East Locality Map Transport for NSW

Ferry wharves in Sydney
Balmain East, New South Wales